Michael Danilczuk (Polish: Michał Danilczuk, born 14 February 1992) is a Polish dancer and choreographer. Danilczuk is best known for winning the second season of the BBC One competition series, The Greatest Dancer with his partner, Jowita Przystał. He is also a professional dancer on the Polish and Irish versions of Dancing with the Stars.

Career
Danilczuk and his partner Jowita Przystał have represented Poland in national and international competitions. In 2014 they became Polish Open Latin Champions. They have also performed with Burn the Floor. Danilczuk and Przystał have also performed in Broadway musical productions such as Legally Blonde, Priscilla, Queen of the Desert and Rock of Ages. They moved to London in 2019 to pursue careers in the United Kingdom.

The Greatest Dancer
In January 2020, Danilczuk and Przystał auditioned for the second season of the BBC One show, The Greatest Dancer. After their audition, they advanced to call backs and were mentored by Strictly Come Dancing professional dancer, Oti Mabuse. On 7 March, 2020 they were crowned winners of the second series. The prize was £50,000 and an opportunity to perform on the next series of BBC One's Strictly Come Dancing.

Dancing with the Stars

Poland (Taniec z gwiazdami)
In July 2022, it was announced that Danilczuk would join the twenty-sixth season of the Polish version of Dancing with the Stars. He partnered model and Prince Charming star, Jacek Jelonek, becoming the country's first ever same-sex pairing. The couple went on to reach the grand finale of the competition, they finished as runners-up to eventual winners, Ilona Krawczyńska and Robert Rowiński.

Series 26 (2022)
 Celebrity partner
 Jacek Jelonek; Average: 37.2; Place: 2nd

Ireland
In November 2022, it was announced that Danilczuk would be joining the sixth season of the Irish version of the show as a professional dancer. He was partnered with television presenter and entrepreneur, Suzanne Jackson. They reached the final, finishing as joint runners-up to Carl Mullan & Emily Barker.

Series 6 (2023)
Celebrity partner
Suzanne Jackson; Average: 25.6; Place: 2nd

References

1992 births
Living people
Polish ballroom dancers